Jakob Hlasek and Patrick McEnroe were the defending champions, but McEnroe did not compete this year. Hlasek teamed up with Marc Rosset and lost in the quarterfinals to Karel Nováček and David Rikl.

Tom Nijssen and Cyril Suk won the title by defeating Karel Nováček and David Rikl 6–3, 6–4 in the final.

Seeds

Draw

Draw

References

External links
 Official results archive (ATP)
 Official results archive (ITF)

1992 ATP Tour